Franziska Knuppe (born 7 December 1974 in Rostock) is a German model and actress.

Biography
She was discovered by designer Wolfgang Joop in 1997 at a café in Potsdam. She was featured prominently in campaigns of Triumph International, JOOP!, Oasis and Reebok. She modeled for e.g. Thierry Mugler, Diane von Fürstenberg, Escada, Rocobarocco, Wunderkind Couture, Jasper Conran, Betty Jackson, Strenesse, Vivienne Westwood and Issey Miyake. She was photographed by i.a. Peter Lindbergh, Karl Lagerfeld, Michel Comte, Manfred Baumann, and Arthur Elgort.

Knuppe married Christian Möstl in 1999. They both had a daughter, Mathilda, in 2007.

In 2008, she was the host of Supermodel and in 2019, she reprised that role on the Austrian equivalent of Austria's Next Top Model. In 2020, she appeared as the Bat on the German version of Masked Singer.

Award
2009 Vienna Fashion Award, model category

References
3nach9 TV interview

External links
Official website of Franziska Knuppe

1974 births
German female models
German actresses
Living people
People from Rostock
People from Potsdam